Paul Hunter is an American film director, screenwriter, and music video director. He has directed over 100 music videos, television advertisements and was nominated for an Emmy for Nike's Freestyle commercial. In 2004, the Washington Post called Hunter one of "most seminal names among black hip-hop directors."

Hunter graduated from Cal State Northridge with a degree in Radio, TV & Film.

Hunter has worked with musical artists including Whitney Houston, Aaliyah, Pharrell, Dr. Dre, TLC, Tyrese Gibson, Beyoncé, LL Cool J, Justin Timberlake, Lenny Kravitz, Janet Jackson, Mariah Carey, and Michael Jackson.

Hunter made his feature-length directorial debut with Bulletproof Monk, starring Chow Yun Fat and Seann William Scott.

Hunter's directed the music video of Michael Jackson's come-back single, 'You Rock My World' and the award-winning "Lady Marmalade" video for the soundtrack to the film Moulin Rouge! (2001).

While working with Prettybird, Hunter has also done commercial work including a spot for Bacardi he co-directed with actor Michael B. Jordan.

Selected music video credits

Filmography

Film
 Bulletproof Monk (2003)

Awards

Commercials
 2010 - London International Advertising Awards - Bronze Television/Cinema/ Digital/Web/Mobile - Axe: "Destiny" (Director)
 2010 - Cannes Lion International Festival of Creativity - Bronze Award: Product & Service/Cosmetics & Beauty - Axe: "Destiny" (Director)
 2013 - Samsung Galaxy Note 3 TV Commercial / Digital Short Film (Director)

Music videos

 2007 - MVPA Awards - Best Direction of a Male Artist - Justin Timberlake: "My Love" (Director)
 2006 - MVPA Awards - R&B Video of the Year - Stevie Wonder: "So What the Fuss" (Director)
 2002 - MVPA Awards - Hollywood Digital Award for Rap Video of the Year - Jay-Z: "Guilty Until Proven Innocent" (Director)
 2001 - MTV Video Music Awards - Best Video of the Year and Best Video From a Film - Mya, Pink, Christina Aguilera, Lil' Kim: "Lady Marmalade" (Director)
 2000 - MVPA Awards - Best Direction of a Male Video - D'Angelo: "Untitled (How Does It Feel)" (Director)
 1999 - MTV Video Music Awards - Best Cinematography in a Video - Marilyn Manson: "The Dope Show" (Director)
 1999 - MVPA Awards - Rock Video of the Year and Best Direction of a Music Video - Marilyn Manson: "The Dope Show" (Director)
 1997 - MTV Video Music Awards - Best Rap Video - The Notorious B.I.G.: "Hypnotize" (Director)
 1997 - MVPA Awards - Best Urban/R&B Video - Erykah Badu: "On & On" (Director)

Notes

External links
PRETTYBIRD

Living people
Television commercial directors
American music video directors
African-American film directors
Film directors from Los Angeles
Year of birth missing (living people)
21st-century African-American people